Without Description is an Iranian Comedy series. The series is directed by Mehdi Mazloumi. The series was rebroadcast in 2019 on the iFilm TV channel

Storyline 
Without Description is the story of the office of a weekly newspaper called The Beautiful City, which is going bankrupt, But the Weekly newspaper editor, staff and manager are trying to keep the weekly newspaper and this creates interesting adventures in this TV series.

Cast 
 Fathali Oveisi
 Amir Jafari
 Bijan Banafshehkhah
 Falamak Joneidi
 Leyli Rashidi
 Reza Shafiei Jam
 Shabnam Tolouei
 Amir Noori
 Mehdi Sabaei
 Maryam Saadat
 Amir Hossein Sadigh
 Ali Ghorban Zadeh
 Shabnam Tolouei
 Mahmoud Basiri
 Sima Motalebi
 Roksana Razavi
 Katayoun Amirebrahimi
 Mahshad Mokhberi
 Ramin Sayardashti

References

External links
 

Iranian comedy television series
2000s Iranian television series